The Church of San Zaccaria  is a 15th-century former monastic church in central Venice, Italy. It is a large edifice, located in the Campo San Zaccaria, just off the waterfront to the southeast of Piazza San Marco and St Mark's Basilica. It is dedicated to St. Zechariah, the father of John the Baptist.

History

The first church on the site was founded by Doge Giustiniano Participazio in the early 9th century to house the body of the saint to which it is dedicated, a gift of the Byzantine Emperor Leo V the Armenian, which it contains under the second altar on the right. The remains of various doges are buried in the crypt of the church. The original church was rebuilt in the 1170s (when the present campanile was built) and was replaced by a Gothic church in the 15th century. The remains of this building still stand, as the present church was built beside and not over it.

The present church was built between 1458 and 1515. Antonio Gambello was the original architect, who started the building in the Gothic style, but the upper part of the facade with its arched windows and its columns, and the upper parts of the interior were completed by Mauro Codussi in early Renaissance style many years later. The facade is a harmonious Venetian mixture of late-Gothic and Renaissance styles.

Monastery

The church was originally attached to a Benedictine monastery of nuns also founded by  Participazio and various other doges of the family. The nuns of this monastery mostly came from prominent noble families of the city and had a reputation for laxness in their observance of the monastic enclosure. The abbess was usually related to the doge.

In 855, Pope Benedict III took refuge in the monastery while fleeing the violence of the Antipope Anastasius, whose election his supporters had challenged. Out of gratitude, Pope Benedict gave the nuns a large collection of relics which was the foundation of a large collection for which the monastery was famed, among which were those of Athanasius of Alexandria and a piece of the True Cross.

A devastating fire destroyed the entire monastic complex in 1105. According to chronicles of the time, some one hundred nuns who had taken refuge in the cellars of the monastery died from smoke inhalation.

Under the direction of Enrico Dandolo, the convent was reformed into a Cluniac house.

The monastery had the tradition of being visited by the doge and his entire court annually at Easter in a ceremony which included presentation of the corno ducale (ducal cap), insignia of his office. This tradition is said to have begun in the 12th century after the nuns had donated land for the building of a ducal chapel, now St Mark's Basilica, and ended only in 1797, at the end of the Republic, when the monastery was suppressed by the invading forces of Napoleon's army.

Interior
The interior of the church has an apse surrounded by an ambulatory lit by tall Gothic windows, a typical feature of Northern European church architecture which is unique in Venice. Nearly every wall is covered with paintings by 17th and 18th century artists. The church houses one of the most famous work by Giovanni Bellini, the San Zaccaria Altarpiece. The walls of the aisles and of the chapels host paintings by other artists including Andrea del Castagno, Palma Vecchio, Tintoretto, Giuseppe Porta, Palma il Giovane, Antonio Vassilacchi, Anthony van Dyck, Andrea Celesti, Antonio Zanchi, Antonio Balestra, Angelo Trevisani and Giovanni Domenico Tiepolo.

The artist Alessandro Vittoria is buried in the church, his tomb marked by a self-portrait bust.

The organ of the church was built by Gaetano Callido in 1790.

External links
Satellite image from Google Maps
Adrian Fletcher's Paradoxplace Venice Pages – San Zaccaria (photos)

References

9th-century establishments in Italy
Benedictine nunneries in Italy
Christian monasteries established in the 9th century
Roman Catholic churches completed in 1515
15th-century Roman Catholic church buildings in Italy
Roman Catholic churches in Venice
Renaissance architecture in Venice
Monasteries destroyed during the French Revolution